The Bandaranaike family
is a Sri Lankan Sinhalisation of Kerala Tamil family origin that is prominent in family politics. Along with many members who have been successful politician across generations, the family includes three Prime Ministers and one President of Sri Lanka.

History
The Bandaranayaka family is claimed to originate from Nilaperumal Pandaram, who was from India and served as high priest of the Temple of Nawagamuwa Pattini Devalaya. The family changed their name to the Sinhalese form of Bandaranaike and adopted Portuguese names like Dias. They served the Portuguese and, later, Dutch colonial rulers. Their golden era began as translators and local scribes, expanding their influence and power. A member of the family, Don William Dias, who served as a translator for the British, was present when deposed the Kandyan King Sri Vikrama Rajasingha was captured while in hiding by Ekneligoda Disawa.

Family tree

 Don Francisco Dias Wijetunga Bandaranaike (born 1720), Mudaliyar Hewagam Korale + Dona MarKumarathunga
 Conrad Pieter Dias Wijewardena Bandaranaike, Maha Mudliyar
 Jacabus Dias Wijewardena Bandaranaike (born 1780), Mudaliyar of Governor Gate & Translator of Supreme Court + Liyanage Catherine Philipsz Panditharatne
 John Charles Dias Bandaranaike, Member of Legislative Council of Ceylon 
 Sir Harry Dias Bandaranaike, Puisne Justice of the Supreme Court of Sri Lanka and Member of Legislative Council
 Rev Canon Samuel William Dias Bandaranaike + Cornelia Susanna Elizabeth Dias Bandaranaike
 James Peter Obeyesekere I (stepson of Cornelia's first marriage to D. B. Ferdinandus Obeysekere), Member of Legislative Council + Corneliya Henrietta Dias Bandaranaike (daughter of Don Christoffel Henricus Dias Bandaranaike)
  Sir James Peter Obeyesekere II, Head Mudaliyar
 Deshamanya James Peter Obeyesekere III, Parliamentary Secretary to the Minister of Health and Finance, Senator and Member of Parliament for Attanagalla + Deshamanya Siva Obeyesekere, Cabinet Minister of Health and Member of Parliament for Mirigama 
 Donald Obeyesekere, Member of the Legislative Council and the State Council of Ceylon.
 Sir Solomon Christoffel Obeyesekere (stepson of Cornelia's first marriage to D. B. Ferdinandus Obeysekere), Member of Legislative Council 
  Sir Forester Augustus Obeysekera, Member of the Legislative Council and Speaker of the State Council.
  Daisy Ezline Obeysekera + Sir Solomon Dias Bandaranaike
  Liliyan Augusta Obeysekera + Gate Mudaliyar Simon William Ilangakoon
 Christophel Panini Illangakoon, Member of Parliament for Weligama 
 Felix Reginold Dias Bandaranaike (1861–1947) + Annie Lucy (Florence) de Alwis (1864–1920)
 Reginald Felix Dias Bandaranaike (1891–1951), Judge of the Supreme Court + Freda Dias Abeysinghe
 Felix Dias Bandaranaike (1930–1985), Government Minister, Member of Parliament
 Don Daniel Dias Bandaranaike + Dona Clara Amarasekere
 Don Solomon Dias Bandaranaike (-1859), Mudaliyar of Siyane Korale, 1st Udagaha Mudaliyar + Cornelia Philipsz Panditharatne de Saram
 Don Christoffel Henricus Dias Abeywickrema Jayatilake Seneviratne Bandaranaike (born 1826), Mudaliyar Governors Gate and 2nd Udagaha Mudaliyar + Anna Florentina Philipsz Panditharatne
 Sir Solomon Dias Bandaranaike (1862–1946), Maha Mudaliyar + Daisy Ezline Obeyesekere
 S. W. R. D. Bandaranaike (1899–1959), Prime Minister of Ceylon, Government Minister, Member of Parliament, Member of State Council + Sirimavo Bandaranaike (1916–2000), Prime Minister of Ceylon, Member of Parliament, Senator
 Sunethra Bandaranaike (born c. 1943), politician and socialite
 Chandrika Bandaranaike (born 1945), President of Sri Lanka, Prime Minister of Sri Lanka, Member of Parliament, Chief Minister of Western Province, Provincial Councillor + Vijaya Kumaratunga (1945–1988), actor and politician
Yashodara Sirimavo Kumarathunga Walker
Vimukthi Kumaratunga
 Anura Bandaranaike (1949–2008); Speaker of the Parliament of Sri Lanka, Government Minister, Member of Parliament

Other members of the family include;
 S. D. Bandaranayake
 Pandu Bandaranaike
 James de Alwis
 Albert L. De Alwis Seneviratne

(also related to Ratwatte family, William Gopallawa, A.R. Udugama, Hector Kobbekaduwa, Jeewan Kumaranatunga)

Horagolla Bandaranaike Samadhi

The Horagolla Bandaranaike Samadhi is the final resting place of Solomon West Ridgeway Dias Bandaranaike and his wife Sirimavo Ratwatte Dias Bandaranaike. It is located in the grounds of the Bandaranaike property of Horagolla in Atthanagalla, Western Province, Sri Lanka.

See also

List of political families in Sri Lanka

References

https://www.thearchives.lk/swrds-father-in-1924/